Flight attendants appear in films, television and printed works. This is a list of some appearances.

 1932-1950's:  Ann of the Airlanes was a syndicated American radio adventure drama series focused on Ann Burton, an aspiring airplane hostess portrayed by Lynne Howard (possibly a stage name for Hollywood native Elia Braca).
 1933: Air Hostess portrays a love story about a flight attendant (Evalyn Knapp) and a pilot (James Murray).
 1940: Flight Angels portrays stewardess training at an airline, and showcases the relationship between various members of flight crew.
 1947: The Vicki Barr Flight Stewardess Series book series, in which Vicki's career "brings her glamorous friends, exciting adventures, loyal roommates and dates with a handsome young pilot and an up-and-coming reporter", sells well in the US.
 1950: In Batman #62 (December/January), it is revealed that Catwoman is an amnesiac flight attendant who had turned to crime after suffering a prior blow to the head during a plane crash she survived. The name of the airline she worked for was Speed Airlines.
 1951: Three Guys Named Mike is a film about flight attendant Marcy (Jane Wyman) who has to choose between three admirers and becomes an advertising icon.
 1955: Out of the Clouds, British drama film directed by Basil Dearden, and starring Anthony Steel, Robert Beatty and James Robertson Justice. An Ealing Studios production, the film is composed of small stories dealing with the passengers and crew on a day at London Airport (the name of Heathrow Airport 1946–1966).
 1956: Julie, starring Doris Day featured a flight attendant piloting a plane to safety.
 1959: An Angel on Wheels, a German comedy with Romy Schneider as a guardian angel who disguises herself as a flight attendant.
 1963: Come Fly with Me features Dolores Hart, Pamela Tiffin and Lois Nettleton as air stewardesses who find romance in this adaptation of Bernard Glemser's 1960 novel, "Girl on a Wing".
 1965: Boeing Boeing, based on a popular play, stars Tony Curtis as an American journalist in Paris who is simultaneously engaged to three different flight attendants.
 1965: Mickey Rooney has a major role as a purser in the movie 24 Hours to Kill. It was filmed in Lebanon using a Comet jetliner.
 1967: memoir Coffee, Tea or Me?, by Trudy Baker and Rachel Jones recounts the romantic adventures of two flight attendants.
 In the late sixties the sexploitation film industry began producing erotic comedies and dramas based on the "swinging stewardess" fantasy image. This "stewardess-sploitation" cycle includes: Bedroom Stewardesses (Germany, 1968), The Stewardesses (1969), Stewardesses Report (Switzerland, 1971), The Air Stewardess (Greece, 1971), Swedish Fly Girls (Denmark, 1971), Fly Me (1973), The Naughty Stewardesses (1974), Blazing Stewardesses (1975), and Stewardess School (1986).
 1978-1979: Flying High, short-lived comedy-drama TV series starring Connie Sellecca about the lives of three attractive flight attendants. 
 1985: "Waitress in the Sky", a derisive song about a stewardess, appeared on the critically praised album Tim by The Replacements.
 1986:  Air Hostess (TV series), an Indian television show about the life of a flight attendant.
 1990: "Die Hard 2", flights attendants on multiple flights are seen; one of the flights crashes into the runway presumably killing all on board.
 1992: American film, Passenger 57, features many flight attendants on board a commercial flight that also transports a criminal.
 1996: Australian comedian Caroline Reid creates the character "Pam Ann" to satirise the stereotypical aspects of the job of the female flight attendant.
 1997: Jackie Brown, a Quentin Tarantino directed crime drama starring Pam Grier as a flight attendant.
 1997: Turbulence, action-thriller with Lauren Holly as a flight attendant.
 Turbulence 2 and Turbulence 3.
 2001 - 2008, James Wysong wrote a series of popular books about his life as a flight attendant under the  "wryly chosen" penname, A. Frank Steward.
 2002: In the American movie, "Catch me if you can" Tom Hanks and Leo De Caprio act with flight attendants, including Pan Am flight attendants.
 2003: View from the Top - romantic comedy starring Gwyneth Paltrow as an aspiring flight attendant.
 2003: "Toxic", music video for Britney Spears hit single features Spears as a sexy stewardess in a highly stylized vintage Pan Am-style blue uniform.
 2003: Mile High, British television series features a group of flight attendants working for the fictitious low-cost carrier "Fresh!".
 2004: the single Air Hostess by Busted reaches No. 2 in the UK singles chart.
 2006: Attention Please, Japanese television drama about the training of flight attendants for Japan Airlines
 2007: British pop group Scooch, comes 22nd in the Eurovision Song Contest 2007 with the song "Flying the Flag (For You)", featuring flight attendants and including a liberal amount of sexual innuendo. 
 2008: Happy Flight, which is about a copilot and flight attendant on an ANA flight to Hawaii.
 2010:  Fly Girls (TV series), an American reality television series that follows the personal lives of five flight attendants working for Virgin America.
 2011-2012: Pan Am, TV series period-piece drama set in 1963-1964 about the lives of Pan American World Airways stewardesses starring Christina Ricci and Margot Robbie.
 2014: Take Off! with The Savvy Stews premieres on Destination America hosted by two flight attendants Bobby Laurie and Gailen David and profiling flight attendant layovers around the world.
2016: Neerja an Indian movie about Neerja Bhanot, head flight attendant at the Pan Am Flight 73, who saved the life of her crew and passenger and was awarded Ashoka Chakra (military decoration)
2019: Uyare, the story of a young woman whose dreams of becoming a pilot are ended by an acid attack by a jealous boyfriend, but who recovers to be a flight attendant and heroine.

A common trope in aviation disaster films is a flight attendant having to fly, and sometimes land, an airliner, after the pilots are killed or incapacitated. Such films include:

 Without Orders
 Fugitive in the Sky
 Flying Hostess
 Julie
 Airport 1975
 Airplane!
 Panic in the Skies!
 Executive Decision
 Turbulence
 Air Panic
 Snakes on a Plane
 Uyare

References

Flight attendants
Aviation mass media
Works about flight attendants